Monogram Pictures Corporation was an American film studio that produced mostly low-budget films between 1931 and 1953, when the firm completed a transition to the name Allied Artists Pictures Corporation. Monogram was among the smaller studios in the golden age of Hollywood, generally referred to collectively as Poverty Row. Lacking the financial resources to deliver the lavish sets, production values, and star power of the larger studios, Monogram sought to attract its audiences with the promise of action and adventure.

The company's trademark is now owned by Allied Artists International. The original sprawling brick complex which functioned as home to both Monogram and Allied Artists remains at 4376 Sunset Drive, utilized as part of the Church of Scientology Media Center (formerly KCET's television facilities).

History
Monogram was created in the early 1930s from two earlier companies; W. Ray Johnston's Rayart Productions (renamed Raytone when sound pictures came in) and Trem Carr's Sono Art-World Wide Pictures. Both specialized in low-budget features, a policy which continued at Monogram Pictures, with Carr in charge of production. Another independent producer, Paul Malvern, released 16 Lone Star western productions (starring John Wayne) through Monogram.

The backbone of the studio's early days was a father-son partnership: writer/director Robert N. Bradbury and cowboy actor Bob Steele (born Robert A. Bradbury). Bradbury wrote almost all of the early Monogram and Lone Star westerns and directed many of them himself. Monogram offered a selection of film genres, including action melodramas, classics, and mysteries. In its early years, Monogram could seldom afford big-name movie stars and would employ either former silent-film actors who were idle (Herbert Rawlinson, William Collier Sr.) or young featured players (Ray Walker, Wallace Ford, William Cagney, Charles Starrett).

In 1935, Johnston and Carr were wooed by Herbert Yates of Consolidated Film Industries; Yates planned to merge Monogram with several other smaller independent companies to form Republic Pictures. After a brief period under this new venture, Johnston and Carr clashed with Yates and left. Carr moved to Universal Pictures, while Johnston reactivated Monogram in 1937.

Film series
In 1938, Monogram began a long and profitable policy of making series and hiring familiar players to star in them. Frankie Darro, Hollywood's foremost tough-kid actor of the 1930s, joined Monogram and stayed with the company until 1950. Comedian Mantan Moreland co-starred in many of the Darro films and continued to be a valuable asset to Monogram through 1949. Juvenile actors Marcia Mae Jones and Jackie Moran co-starred in series of homespun romances, and then joined the Frankie Darro series.

Boris Karloff contributed to the Monogram release schedule with his Mr. Wong mysteries. This prompted producer Sam Katzman to engage Bela Lugosi for a follow-up series of Monogram thrillers. 

Katzman's street-gang series The East Side Kids was an imitation of the then-popular Dead End Kids features. The first film cast six juveniles who had no connection with the Dead End series, but Katzman signed Dead End Kids Bobby Jordan and Leo Gorcey, and soon added Huntz Hall and Gabriel Dell from the original gang. The East Side Kids series ran from 1940 to 1945. East Side star Gorcey then took the reins himself and transformed the series into The Bowery Boys, which became the longest-running feature-film comedy series in movie history (48 titles over 12 years). During this run, Gorcey became the highest-paid actor in Hollywood on an annual basis.

Monogram continued to experiment with film series with mixed results. Definite box-office hits were Charlie Chan, The Cisco Kid, and Joe Palooka, all proven movie properties abandoned by other studios and revived by Monogram. Less successful were the comic-strip exploits of Snuffy Smith, the mysterious adventures of The Shadow, and Sam Katzman's comedy series teaming Billy Gilbert, Shemp Howard, and Maxie Rosenbloom. Other series included the Bomba, the Jungle Boy adventures starring Johnny Sheffield (formerly "Boy" of the Tarzan films); the "Henry" series of small-town comedies co-starring Raymond Walburn and Walter Catlett; the Roddy McDowall series, with the juvenile lead forsaking child roles for dramatic and action vehicles; and the Bringing Up Father comedies based on the George McManus comic strip, featuring Joe Yule and Renie Riano as "Jiggs and Maggie."

Many of Monogram's series were westerns. The studio released sagebrush sagas with Bill Cody, Bob Steele, John Wayne, Tom Keene, Tim McCoy, Tex Ritter, and Jack Randall before hitting on the "trio" format teaming veteran saddle pals. Buck Jones, Tim McCoy, and Raymond Hatton became The Rough Riders; Ray (Crash) Corrigan, John "Dusty" King, and Max Terhune were The Range Busters, and Ken Maynard, Hoot Gibson, and Bob Steele teamed as The Trail Blazers. When Universal Pictures allowed Johnny Mack Brown's contract to lapse, Monogram grabbed him and kept him busy through 1952.

Monogram's stars
The studio was a launching pad for new stars (Preston Foster in Sensation Hunters, Randolph Scott in Broken Dreams, Ginger Rogers in The Thirteenth Guest, Lionel Atwill in The Sphinx, Alan Ladd in Her First Romance, Robert Mitchum in When Strangers Marry. The studio was also a haven for established stars whose careers had stalled: Edmund Lowe in Klondike Fury, John Boles in Road to Happiness, Ricardo Cortez in I Killed That Man, Simone Simon in Johnny Doesn't Live Here Anymore, Kay Francis and Bruce Cabot in Divorce.

Monogram did create and nurture its own stars. Gale Storm began her career at RKO Radio Pictures in 1940 but found a home at Monogram. Storm had been promoted from Monogram's Frankie Darro series and was showcased in crime dramas (like The Crime Smasher (1943) opposite Richard Cromwell and radio's Frank Graham in the title role) and a string of musicals to capitalize on her singing talents (like Campus Rhythm and Nearly Eighteen (both 1943), as well as Swing Parade of 1946 featuring The Three Stooges). Another of Monogram's finds during this time was British skating star Belita, who conversely starred in musical revues first and then graduated to dramatic roles, including Suspense (1946), an A-budget King Brothers Productions picture released under the Monogram name.

In the mid-1940s Monogram very nearly hit the big time with Dillinger, a sensationalized crime drama that was a runaway success in 1945. Filmed by King Brothers Productions, it received an Academy Award nomination for Best Original Screenplay. Monogram tried to follow Dillinger immediately (with several "exploitation" melodramas cashing in on topical themes), and did achieve some success, but Monogram never became a respectable "major" studio like former poverty-row denizen Columbia Pictures.

The only Monogram release to win the Academy Award was Climbing the Matterhorn, which won the Best Short Subject (Two Reeler) Oscar in 1947. Other Monogram films to receive Oscar nominations were King of the Zombies for Academy Award for Best Music (Music Score of a Dramatic Picture) in 1941 and Flat Top for Best Film Editing in 1952.

Monogram filmed some of its later features in Cinecolor, mostly outdoor subjects like County Fair, Blue Grass of Kentucky, and The Rose Bowl Story, as well as the science-fiction film, Flight to Mars (1952).

Creation of Allied Artists Productions
Producer Walter Mirisch began at Monogram after World War II as assistant to studio head Steve Broidy. He convinced Broidy that the days of low-budget films were ending, and in 1946 Monogram created a new unit, Allied Artists Productions, to make costlier films. The new name was meant to mirror the name of United Artists by invoking images of "creative personnel uniting to produce and distribute quality films".

At a time when the average Hollywood picture cost about $800,000 (and the average Monogram picture cost about $90,000), Allied Artists' first release, the Christmas-themed comedy It Happened on Fifth Avenue (1947), cost more than $1,200,000. It was rewarded with an estimated $1.8 million box office return. Subsequent Allied Artists releases were more economical, but were filmed in color.

The studio's new policy permitted what Mirisch called "B-plus" pictures, which were released along with Monogram's established line of B fare. Mirisch's prediction about the end of the low-budget film had come true thanks to television, and in September 1952 Monogram announced that henceforth it would only produce films bearing the Allied Artists name. The Monogram brand name was retired in 1953, and the company was now known as Allied Artists Pictures Corporation.

Allied Artists retained a few vestiges of its Monogram identity, continuing its popular Stanley Clements action series (through 1953), its B-Westerns (through 1954), its Bomba, the Jungle Boy adventures (through 1955), and especially its breadwinning comedy series with The Bowery Boys (through 1958, with Clements replacing Leo Gorcey). For the most part, Allied Artists was heading in new, ambitious directions under Mirisch.

Interstate/Allied Artists Television

Monogram cautiously entered the field of television syndication. Every studio except Paramount avoided putting its own name on its television subsidiary, fearing adverse reaction from its movie-theater customers. Monogram followed suit, christening its TV arm as Interstate Television Corporation. Interstate's biggest success was the Little Rascals series (formerly Hal Roach's "Our Gang" comedies, which had been reissued for theaters by Monogram). In later years Interstate TV became Allied Artists Television.

Allied Artists' television library was sold to Lorimar's TV production and distribution arms in 1979. Lorimar was acquired by Warner Bros. Television, which now controls the library.

Allied Artists' major productions
For a time in the mid-1950s, the Mirisch family held great influence at Allied Artists, with Walter as executive producer, his brother Harold as head of sales, and brother Marvin as assistant treasurer. They pushed the studio into big-budget filmmaking, signing contracts with William Wyler, John Huston, Billy Wilder and Gary Cooper. When their first big-name productions, Wyler's Friendly Persuasion which was nominated for six Academy Awards including Best Picture and Wilder's Love in the Afternoon were box-office flops in 1956–57, studio head Broidy reverted to the kind of pictures Monogram had previously been known for: low-budget action pictures and thrillers, such as Don Siegel's science-fiction film Invasion of the Body Snatchers (1956). Allied Artists and The Mirisch Company released some (but not all) of their late-1950s films through United Artists. 

Studio chief Steve Broidy retired in 1965. Allied Artists ceased production in 1966 and became a distributor of foreign films, but restarted production with the release of Cabaret (1972) and followed it with Papillon (1973). Both were critical and commercial successes, but high production and financing costs meant they were not big moneymakers for the company. Allied raised financing for their adaptation of The Man Who Would Be King (1975) by selling the European distribution rights to Columbia Pictures and the rest of the backing came from Canadian tax shelters. King was released in 1975, but received disappointing returns. That same year, the company distributed the French import Story of O, but spent much of its earnings defending itself from obscenity charges.

In 1976, Allied Artists attempted to diversify when it merged with consumer producers Kalvex and PSP, Inc. The new Allied Artists Industries, Inc. manufactured pharmaceuticals, mobile homes, and activewear in addition to films.

Demise
Monogram/Allied Artists continued until 1979, when runaway inflation and high production costs pushed it into bankruptcy.

Film library fate
The post-1945 Monogram/Allied Artists library was bought by television production company Lorimar in 1980 for $4.75 million; today a majority of this library belongs to Warner Bros. Pictures (via their acquisition of Lorimar in 1989). The pre-1946 Monogram library was sold in 1954 to Associated Artists Productions, which itself was sold to United Artists in 1958 (it merged with Metro-Goldwyn-Mayer in 1981). The pre-1946 Monogram library was not part of the deal with Ted Turner. (The rights to many of the later films are now owned by MGM; others, such as The Big Combo, lapsed into the public domain.) A selection of post-1938 Monogram films acquired by M&A Alexander Productions and Astor Pictures were later incorporated into Republic Pictures' library, today a part of Paramount Global-owned Paramount Pictures. Most Monogram Pictures films released before 1942 are in the public domain.

Jean-Luc Godard dedicated his film Breathless (1960) to Monogram.

Studios

Sunset Boulevard
Allied Artists had its studio at 4401 W. Sunset Boulevard in Hollywood, on a 4.5-acre lot. The longtime home (since 1971) of former PBS television station KCET, the station sold the studios to the Church of Scientology in April 2011.

Monogram Ranch
Monogram Pictures operated the Monogram Ranch, its movie ranch in Placerita Canyon near Newhall, California, in the northern San Gabriel Mountains foothills. Tom Mix had used the Placeritos Ranch for location shooting for his silent western films. Ernie Hickson became the owner in 1936 and reconstructed all the "frontier western town" sets, moved from the nearby Republic Pictures Movie Ranch (present day Disney Golden Oak Ranch), onto his  ranch. A year later Monogram Pictures signed a long-term lease with Hickson for Placeritos Ranch, with terms that stipulated that the ranch be renamed Monogram Ranch. Actor/cowboy singer/producer Gene Autry purchased the Monogram Ranch property from the Hickson heirs in 1953, renaming it after his film Melody Ranch. As of 2010, it was operated as the Melody Ranch Motion Picture Studio and Melody Ranch Studios.

After fire damage, the sets were replaced; as of 2012, the studio had 74 buildings (including offices) and two sound stages. The owners in 2019 were Renaud and Andre Veluzat. The owners indicate that other recent movies were also partly filmed here, including Once Upon a Time in Hollywood. The site includes a movie memorabilia museum that is open to visitors.

Filmography
 List of Monogram Pictures and Allied Artists Pictures films

Further reading
 Ted Okuda, The Monogram Checklist: The Films of Monogram Pictures Corporation, 1931–1952, McFarland & Company, 1999. .
 Don Miller, B Movies, Curtis Books, 1973.

References

External links

Copyright status of Monogram's entire output At DukeFilmography

 
American film studios
Film distributors of the United States
Film production companies of the United States
Entertainment companies based in California
Cinema of Southern California
Defunct organizations based in Hollywood, Los Angeles
Companies based in Los Angeles
American companies established in 1931
Defunct companies based in Greater Los Angeles
Mass media companies established in 1931
Mass media companies disestablished in 1953
1931 establishments in California
1953 disestablishments in California